Clarence Kolster (September 6, 1895 – May 6, 1972) was an American film editor, active during the later years of the silent era, right through the 1950s.

Biography 
Born in Plattsburgh, New York, in 1895, Clarence began his film career editing the 1922 silent film Rags to Riches. During his 30-year career, he would edit almost 100 films, in addition to working as assistant director on the 1924 film The Lighthouse by the Sea. His career would include such classics as The Painted Desert, also in 1931, which featured Clark Gable's first speaking role; the 1946 remake of Of Human Bondage; Always Leave Them Laughing, starring Milton Berle and Virginia Mayo; and 1958's Our Miss Brooks starring Eve Arden.

But Kolster's crowning achievement was his first mega-hit, the 1931 version of Frankenstein, starring Boris Karloff. Kolster's editing of when the monster is revealed has been called, "... possibly the most distinguished piece of cutting in all of horror movie history." In addition, the creation sequence, the monster finding the small child by the lake, and the confrontation between the monster and Frankenstein's bride, have all become iconic scenes in film history, often imitated and parodied in later pictures.

In 1958, Kolster would make the switch from the big screen to the small screen, where he worked on several television series, including Maverick and 77 Sunset Strip. Kolster retired in 1962, and would die 10 years later.

Filmography
(as per AFI's database)

References

External links
 
 

1895 births
1972 deaths
American film editors